Fighting Fury is a 1924 American silent Western film directed by Clifford Smith and starring Jack Hoxie, Helen Holmes and Fred Kohler. Hoxie has a dual role portraying a father and son.

Cast

Preservation
A fragment of Fighting Fury is held by the Library of Congress.

References

Bibliography
 Darby, William (1991). Masters of Lens and Light: A Checklist of Major Cinematographers and Their Feature Films. Scarecrow Press.

External links

 
 

1924 films
1924 Western (genre) films
American black-and-white films
Films directed by Clifford Smith
Universal Pictures films
Silent American Western (genre) films
1920s English-language films
1920s American films